Mark Rowley  (born 29 January 1990) is a Scottish actor, who has regular appearances in River City (2013-2014), Young Dracula (2014), Home Fires (2016), The North Water and The Spanish Princess (2020), he played the Irish warrior Finan, Uhtred’s sidekick in battle, in The Last Kingdom (2017-2022), and was Prince Alvitirin in The Witcher: Blood Origin in 2022.

Early life and career
Mark Rowley is from Paisley in Scotland. His interest in acting grew after attending classes at the PACE Theatre Company in Paisley. In 2013, Rowley graduated from the Glasgow based Royal Conservatoire of Scotland.

In 2013, Rowley starred in an episode of Luther alongside Idris Elba, Rowley is purported to be the youngest actor to have played Macbeth at the age of 25, in the 2018 version directed by Kit Monkman. 

From 2017 to 2022, Rowley has played the role of the Irish warrior Finan, Uhtred's sidekick in battle, in the Netflix television medieval drama The Last Kingdom alongside Alexander Dreymon.

Rowley played a leading role in the 2018 short film Lift Share, which premiered at the Edinburgh International Film Festival in June 2018.

In 2020, Rowley appeared as Bain in the BBC's The North Water, along with fellow The Last Kingdom actor, Eliza Butterworth. He also landed a recurring role as Alexander Stewart in series 2 of Starz historical drama The Spanish Princess about Catherine of Aragon before she married Henry VIII of England.

Filming began in January 2022 of the film Seven Kings Must Die, a feature length movie involving the surviving members of The Last Kingdom, due for release in 2023.

In 2022, Rowley joined the cast of the Netflix miniseries The Witcher: Blood Origin, set in a time 1,200 years before The Witcher, and Rowley stars as Prince Alvitirin in a cast which includes Lenny Henry and Michelle Yeoh. The miniseries aired on 25 December 2022.

Filmography

Film

Television

Video games

References

External links
 
 Mark Rowley Agent - Hamilton Hodell
 Finen - Mark Rowley
 The Last Kingdom video - A Day In The Life with Mark Rowley

21st-century Scottish male actors
Scottish male film actors
Living people
People from Paisley, Renfrewshire
Alumni of the Royal Conservatoire of Scotland
1990 births
Scottish male television actors
Scottish male voice actors
Scottish male video game actors